William McCance (1894–1970) was a Scottish artist, and was second Controller of the Gregynog Press in Powys, mid-Wales.

Biography

Born on 6 August 1894 in Cambuslang, Scotland, William McCance was the seventh of eight children. After attending Hamilton Academy, McCance entered Glasgow School of Art, studying there 1911–15 and subsequently undertaking a teacher-training course at Glasgow's Kennedy Street school.

A conscientious objector in World War I, McCance was imprisoned.

After discharge from prison in 1919, McCance and his illustrator/engraver wife, Agnes Miller Parker (1895-1980, married 1918), moved to London, where McCance was employed as a teacher and art critic, writing for The Spectator.  McCance's paintings in the 1920s were unusual in that he was one of the few Scottish artists who embraced the cubist, abstract and machine-inspired arts movements that spread across Europe following the First World War.

In the 1930s McCance took the post of second Controller of the famous Gregynog Press, Wales, founded in 1922, after which he taught book design at the University of Reading.

William McCance died on 19 November 1970, aged 76 in Ayrshire.

A collection of his paintings is held in the National Galleries of Scotland and Dundee Art Gallery, and in 1975 a retrospective exhibition of his work was shown at Dundee, Glasgow and Edinburgh.

References

External links 
 Glasgow School of Art
 The Gregynog Press, Wales

1894 births
1970 deaths
People educated at Hamilton Academy
Alumni of the Glasgow School of Art
20th-century Scottish painters
Scottish male painters
People from Cambuslang
Scottish art critics
Scottish conscientious objectors
British conscientious objectors
Academics of the University of Reading
Scottish Renaissance
20th-century Scottish male artists